Iławka is a small river in Poland, in Warmian-Masurian Voivodeship.  It flows out of lake Jeziorak, crosses lake Iławskie, and flows into the river Drwęca.  The only major town along its course is Iława.

Rivers of Poland
Rivers of Warmian-Masurian Voivodeship